Ins Offene Messer (engl. Right Into The Trap) is the debut album by German pop-punk band Jennifer Rostock. It was released on 15 February 2008 and produced by Werner Krumme and Christian Bader. The album's lead single, "Kopf Oder Zahl?", was released on 1 February 2008. The song was participating in the Bundesvision Song Contest and reached the fifth place. The album was re-released under the name Ins Offene Messer – Jetzt Noch Besser on 28 November 2008.

Track listing
All songs written by Jennifer Weist and Johannes "Joe" Walter.

Ins Offene Messer - Jetzt Noch Besser
The album was re-released as Ins Offene Messer - Jetzt Noch Besser on 28 November 2008. It contains additional songs, remixes and acoustic versions as well as a bonus DVD with documentary videos of the band, music videos and the video shoot to "Himalaya".

Chart performance

Album

Singles

Ins Offene Messer Tour

The Ins Offene Messer Tour by Jennifer Rostock started in January 2008 and ended in October. The band played over 30 shows in Karlsruhe, Frankfurt, Köln and Jena.

References

2009 debut albums
Jennifer Rostock albums